This is a list of mosques in the Republic of Yemen, in the southern part of the Arabian Peninsula.

See also
 List of mosques in Sana'a
 Islam in Yemen
 Lists of mosques

References

External links

 
Yemen
Mosques